Arthur Marshall Davis (June 7, 1907 – July 11, 1963) was a United States district judge of the United States District Court for the District of Arizona.

Education and career

Born in Winslow, Arizona, Davis received a Bachelor of Laws from George Washington University Law School in 1933. He was in private practice of law in Phoenix, Arizona from 1935 to 1961.

Federal judicial service

Davis was nominated by President John F. Kennedy on August 8, 1961, to the United States District Court for the District of Arizona, to a new seat created by 75 Stat. 80. He was confirmed by the United States Senate on August 21, 1961, and received his commission the same day. His service was terminated on July 11, 1963, due to his death.

References

Sources
 

1907 births
1963 deaths
Judges of the United States District Court for the District of Arizona
United States district court judges appointed by John F. Kennedy
20th-century American judges
George Washington University Law School alumni
People from Winslow, Arizona
20th-century American lawyers